Darcy Dallas (born October 2, 1972) is a Canadian former professional ice hockey defenceman.

Dallas attended Northern Michigan University to play four seasons (1993 – 1997) with the Northern Michigan Wildcats where he captained the NCAA college hockey team, scoring 13 goals and 38 assists for 51 points, while earning 236 penalty minutes, in 106 games played.

Dallas went on to play four years of professional hockey, including 197 regular season and 26 playoff games played with the Pee Dee Pride of the ECHL.

Career statistics

References

External links

1972 births
Living people
Canadian ice hockey defencemen
Ice hockey people from Alberta
Northern Michigan Wildcats men's ice hockey players
Orlando Solar Bears (IHL) players
Pee Dee Pride players
People from Olds, Alberta
San Antonio Iguanas players
Canadian expatriate ice hockey players in the United States